Bruzual is one of the 14 municipalities of the state of Yaracuy, Venezuela. The municipality is located in southwestern Yaracuy, occupying an area of 417 km ² with a population of 69,732 inhabitants in 2011. The capital lies at Chivacoa. It is named after Venezuela's independence hero Manuel Ezequiel Bruzual.

The main agricultural irrigation system  in the Bruzual Municipality is the Yaracuy River where the Cumaripa Dam aids the growing of  sugar cane crops and maize and smaller scale farming of oranges and yams.

Among its main tourist attractions is the Maria Lionza Natural Monument in the mountains of Sorte. Bruzual has a community radio station FM 97.7 Jirah.

References

Municipalities of Yaracuy